Expedition 59 was the 59th Expedition to the International Space Station. It started with the arrival of the Soyuz MS-12 spacecraft carrying Aleksey Ovchinin, Nick Hague and Christina Koch, joining Oleg Kononenko, David Saint-Jacques and Anne McClain who transferred from Expedition 58. The expedition formally began on March 15, 2019 (March 14 in the Americas). Ovchinin and Hague were originally meant to fly to the ISS aboard Soyuz MS-10, but returned to Earth minutes after takeoff due to a contingency abort. The expedition formally ended with the undocking of the Soyuz MS-11 spacecraft carrying Kononenko, Saint-Jacques and McClain on 24 June 2019; Ovchinin, Hague and Koch transferred to Expedition 60.

Crew

Spacewalks

Uncrewed spaceflights to the ISS
Resupply missions that visited the International Space Station during Expedition 59:

Mission summary
Researchers on Expedition 59 will conduct experimentation on tissue chips since the microgravity environment can replicate the effects of aging and disease. The expedition will also conduct experiments on regolith simulants, Earth's atmospheric carbon cycle, and Astrobee robots designed to conduct routine chores aboard the ISS.

Notes

References

Expeditions to the International Space Station
2019 in spaceflight